The Singapore men's national handball team is the national handball team of Singapore. It is governed by the Handball Federation Singapore.

Asian Championship record
2022 – 14th place

Men's team

Men's Youth Team

References

Men's national handball teams
Handball
Handball in Singapore